Ikla is a village in Häädemeeste Parish, Pärnu County, Estonia. The village lies on the Via Baltica (European route E67), on the Estonian–Latvian Border, opposite the Latvian town of Ainaži.

Gallery

References

External links

Estonia–Latvia border crossings
Villages in Pärnu County